Rapid Kuantan (styled as rapidKuantan) is a corporate brand owned by Prasarana Malaysia Berhad (Prasarana) to operate stage bus services in Kuantan, Pahang, Malaysia. It was launched on 1 December 2012.

It currently has a fleet of 80 Scania K-series buses and operates a total of 19 routes.

Routes

See also
 Prasarana Malaysia Berhad
 Rapid Bus Sdn Bhd
 Rapid KL
  BRT Sunway Line
  BRT Federal Line
 Rapid Penang
 Rapid Kuantan
 Land Public Transport Commission (SPAD)
 Public transport in Kuala Lumpur
 Buses in Kuala Lumpur

References

External links 
 

2012 establishments in Malaysia
Transport in Pahang
Bus transport in Malaysia
Malaysian brands